Commons: Journal of Social Criticism (Spilne) is a left-wing Ukrainian magazine established in 2009 that focuses on economics, politics, history, and culture.

History and overview
The idea to create a journal originated in the liva_dumka network (left-wing thought) – a milieu of young left-wing researchers, activists, and students, mostly from the National University of Kyiv-Mohyla Academy. The core of the community was made up of young scholars who grew up in independent Ukraine and were educated in Western universities.

The website was launched on March 24, 2009 and at the same time, the preparation of the first printed issue of the magazine began. The first issue was published in April 2010, as part of an international symposium around the publication of Loïc Wacquant's book Punishing the Poor. The periodicity of the printed journal was stated to be twice a year, but later practice did not correspond to this.

, the magazine has published eleven issues on various topics.

On the tenth anniversary of the magazine, the editors announced that the 12th issue would be the last in print, and that in the future, Commons would work only in an online format.

The magazine has organized or co-organized a number of conferences. In 2019, it launched the annual Feuerbach 11 conference that brings together researchers and activists to discuss Ukraine's socio-economic and political issues.

Ideology and reception
The magazine's position is left-wing and anti-capitalist. The editorial board included Marxists, anarchists, and supporters of other left-wing traditions, but at the same time, the magazine distanced itself from Soviet Marxism-Leninism and declared from the moment of its foundation that “there are no Stalinists among us and there will be none.” The co-founders were guided by the ideas of Michael Burawoy about organic public sociology, and the publication's goal was to analyze social reality, not theoretical polemics between different left-wing traditions. Some editors are activists of the Social Movement organization. Previously, part of the editorial board participated in the activities of the student union Direct Action.

Emily S. Channell-Justice, in her dissertation on the Ukrainian left's participation in the Maidan revolution, argued that the magazine "presented a space for leftist criticism of global issues and events, regularly organizing conferences in Kyiv. Since Maidan, however, a growing ideological split between Political Critique and Commons has detracted from a more robust discussion of the fate of the Ukrainian left, based on the impression that Commons authors present a more dogmatic, class-oriented position rather than promoting a broad, accessible leftist perspective."

According to Medico International, after the 2022 Russian invasion began, the magazine was "considered one of the most important left-wing voices in Ukrainian civil society."

References

External links

2009 establishments in Ukraine
Magazines established in 2009
Socialist magazines
Ukrainian-language magazines